The 1988–89 Sheffield Shield season was the 87th season of the Sheffield Shield, the domestic first-class cricket competition of Australia. Western Australia won the championship, their third in a row.

Table

Final

Statistics

Most Runs
Tom Moody 1038

Most Wickets
Tim May 43

References

Sheffield Shield
Sheffield Shield
Sheffield Shield seasons